Swamithoppu Pathi (Swamithoppu-pathi, Manavai-pathi, Detchana-pathi or Thamarai-pathi) is the primary pathi of the Ayyavazhi, and the sacred venue of the Tavam. Religiously Swamithope is considered primary among the Pancha pathi and the primary centre of the incarnational activities of Vaikundar.

According to Ayyavazhi legends, Lord Vaikundar, an incarnation of Lord Narayana, carried out his tavam at Poovantanthoppe, attracting many followers from across India. On his pass-away Lord Vaikundar was believed to be interred there, and the square-shaped 'pathi' was constructed enveloping him. The holy book Akilathirattu ammanai of Ayyavazhi refers to the temple as "Thoppuppathi".

Genesis and history

As per Akilam, Lord Vaikundar incarnated from the Sea, and after providing rules and regulations to God-heads, came to Detchanam (Swamithoppe) and performed Tavam for six years in the place which was now known as Vada-va-mugam in Swamithoppe. Then when the Kalineesan came to arrest him he went once again into the sea at Muttappathi and after that (in Tamil called the Vinchai), he returned Swamithoppe, from where he was arrested.

Then after his trial he was carried in a Vahana by his devotees to Swamithoppe where he incinerated the evil spirits and unified the Seven Virgins with himself. Then after the marriage with the deities in Ambalappathi he returned to Swamithoppe.

According to Akilathirattu Ammanai, Swamithoppe is the only place Narayana (Vaikundar) slept (in Tamil: Pallikolluthal) after the incarnation. Then he send 700 families to Thuvayal Thavasu to Vakaippathi and organised festivals and celebrations. And after all the Avathara Ekanais he attained Vaikundam and his physical body was interred in the place which is now the Palliyarai of Swamithoppe.

Architecture and structure

The Palliyarai contains two oil lamps (kuthuvilakku), an elunetru, and a large mirror. On a raised pedestal, covered with kavi cloth, the temple also preserves some articles believed to have been used by Ayya Vaikuntar, including a rattan cane (perampu) and a pair of wooden sandals. The Palliyarai is surrounded by inner corridors.

There is a fifty-five feet tall Flagmast at a distance of 50 feet from Palliyarai. And in north of flagmast there is a Unpanpurai. Here, they cook the food and distribute it to the devotees. There is a common well some 300 meters from the main Pathi. Akilattirattu Ammanai states that all the eighteen castes take baths from that well. It was considered sacred to bathe in and to drink the water from that well. Then there found a Paal Kinaru, in the extreme east, Vatakku Vasal in the north and Sivaye Medai, which is also called Karuda medai in the west of Palliyarai. Then all these were surrounded by outer corridors. There is also an Sivalinga and Amman sannathi's near the outer corridors. There is a bell tower above the spot where Vaikundar performed the Tavam. The door of Swamithoppe Palliyarai with the ten avatars of Vishnu carved on it.

The main celebration of Swamithoppe includes Kodiyettru Thirunal, which was celebrated thrice in a year during the Tamil months of Vaikasi, Aavani, Thai. It starts with Kodiyetrru (flag hoisting) and ends on the eleventh day with Car procession. People from different parts of Tamil Nadu and Kerala take part in this festival. Then the Thiru Eadu Vasippu, the Seventeen day festival, in which the whole contents of Akilattirattu Ammanai where read melodiously. It was celebrated during the Tamil month of Karthigai, the month at which it was written by Hari Gopalan Citar.

Nittham Thirunal

As per the instructions in Akilam, the Swamithope pathi conducts daily festival (i.e.) every day is considered as a festival day. So the ritual practices conducted during festival days are conducted here throughout the year, though not in a grand scale as during the other festivals. The daily Panividai starts very early in the morning. Every day, around 3:00 a.m the Dharmagharttas and the people staying at the temple go to Muthirikkinaru and take a holy bath. Then, they return to the Pathi and start the panividai. The Payyan chant Ukappatippu, and the devotees repeat it. Then, they open the door of sanctum sanctorum. It is considered sanctifying to witness this scene with the sounding of a dozen temple bells and conch. Then, there is the Vahana pavani.

Vahana pavani comes around the temple and along the four car streets, first through the Santhana Veethi and then through Ratha Veethi. The Nithiyapal is prepared daily and offered to Ayya Vaikundar ritually. It was the only food Ayya believed to be ate when in human form at Swamithoppe. This offering is done daily. Thavanaipal, a gruel prepared with rice and green gram, is distributed to the devotees.

The Noon Panividai starts around 11 O' clock. Daily Ucchipatippu is chanted. The devotees will repeat it and Thavanaipal is distributed to the devotees. One Sundays, large number of people from far and near come over here to participate in the Ucchipatippu.

In the evening, panividai starts around 5 O' clock. The door of the sanctum sanctorum is opened amidst the sound of the temple bells and Conch. Then, the Payyan would chant ukappatippu. Those followers who congregate for the evening panividai would repeat this. Then, there will be vahana panividai. The Vahana is taken around the temple as well as the four car streets. After this, there will be Annadharmam.

This is the daily routine of Swamithoppe pathi. One can have a worship at any time of the day in this temple.

Ayya Vaikunda Avataram
The most important festival is Ayya Vaikunda Avataram also called as Vaikunda Jayanthi, the day at which Lord Vaikundar incarnated from the sea at Tiruchendur. Though many worship centers including other Pathis conduct celebrations during this festival, it is considered sacred to visit Swamithoppe on this day. So on this day Swamithoppe will get populated with the nationwide Ayyavazhi followers.

This is the largest festival conducted in Swamithope pathi. Several processions were held on that day which starts from different places including Thiruchendur and Thiruvananthapuram and ends at Swamithoppe.

Location

Swamithoppe Pathi is the primary pathi of the five pathis of Ayyavazhi, and its geographical focal point. Swamithoppe Pathi, is located in the town of Swamithope, which lies southeast of the City of Nagercoil, the headquarters (capital) of the District of Kanyakumari in the State of Tamil Nadu at the extreme southern tip of India. Swamithope lies about half-way between the Cities of Nagercoil and Kanniyakumari on the Eathancaud-Manakkudi road.

This Pathi lies north of all other Pathis within Pancha pathi. Nagercoil (12 km) is the nearest Railway Station and Thiruvananthapuram (94 km) is the nearest International Airport. Town buses are available to Swamithope from Nagercoil and Kanyakumari.

See also
Ayyavazhi mythology
Pancha pathi
Ambala Pathi
Poo Pathi
Mutta Pathi
Thamaraikulam Pathi
Avathara Pathi

References

External links

 www.ayyavaikundar.com
 www.vaikundar.com
 www.vaikunt.org
 www.ayyavaigundar.org
www.ayyavazhi.org
www.tsi.org.in
www.india9.com

Holy cities
Pancha pathi
Ayya Vaikundar
Hindu temples in Kanyakumari district
Worship centers of Ayyavazhi